The men's triathlon at the 2016 Summer Olympics took place at Fort Copacabana in Rio de Janeiro on 18 August.

A total of 55 men from 31 nations competed in the race.

Alistair Brownlee from Great Britain became the first man to defend his Olympic triathlon title after his previous win at the 2012 Summer Olympics. His younger brother Jonathan Brownlee finished in second place and added another Olympic medal to his collection after his bronze one from 2012. Henri Schoeman took the bronze and became the first South African to win an Olympic triathlon medal.

Course 
The event took place in Fort Copacabana. It consisted of a single 1.5 kilometres swim lap along the Copacabana beach. The competitors then completed a 38.48 kilometres bike leg consisting of eight 4.81 kilometres laps. The triathletes then ran four 2.5 kilometres laps to the finish line.

Results 
Key
 # denotes the athlete's bib number for the event
 Swimming denotes the time it took the athlete to complete the swimming leg
 Cycling denotes the time it took the athlete to complete the cycling leg
 Running denotes the time it took the athlete to complete the running leg
 Difference denotes the time difference between the athlete and the event winner
 Lapped denotes that the athlete was lapped and removed from the course
* The total time includes both transitions

References 

Men
Men's events at the 2016 Summer Olympics